Pomeranian cuisine generally refers to dishes typical of the area that once formed the historic Province of Pomerania in northeast Germany and which included Stettin (now Szczecin) and Further Pomerania. It is characterised by ingredients produced by Pomeranian farms, such as swede (Wruken) and sugar beet, by poultry rearing, which has produced the famous Pomeranian goose, by the wealth of fish in the Baltic Sea, rivers and inland lakes of the Pomeranian Lake District, and the abundance of quarry in Pomeranian forests. Pomeranian cuisine is hearty. Several foodstuffs have a particularly important role to play here in the region: potatoes, known as Tüften, prepared in various ways and whose significance is evinced by the existence of a West Pomeranian Potato Museum (Vorpommersches Kartoffelmuseum), Grünkohl and sweet and sour dishes produced, for example, by baking fruit.

Pomeranian farmers were self-sufficient: crops were stored until the following harvest, meat products were preserved in the smoke store of the home, or in the smokeries of larger villages such as Schlawin. Fruit, vegetables, lard and Gänseflomen were preserved by bottling in jars. Syrup was made from the sugar beet itself.

Specialities

Soups 
 Gänseschwarzsauer
 Kliebensuppe
 Pomeranian duck soup (Pommersche Entensuppe)

Fish 
Gebackener Spickaal (baked, smoked eel)
Braden Maischull
Pomeranian caviar (Pommerscher Kaviar)

Pork and beef dishes 
Kloppschinken
Topfleberwurst
Mecklenburg roast ribs (Mecklenburger Rippenbraten)

Stews, vegetable and potato dishes 

Tüffel un Plum (potato soup with plums and bacon)
Buttermilk soup with bacon and onions in the Pomeranian style (Buttermilchsuppe mit Speck und Zwiebeln auf pommersche Art)
Elderberry soup (Fliederbeersuppe)
Pomeranian wheat blintzes (Pommersche Hefeplinsen)
Pomeranian dumplings (Pommersche Klöße)
Pomeranian Tollatsch (Pommersche Tollatschen)
Schwemmklöße
Buttermilk potatoes (Buttermilchkartoffel)
Birnen, Bohnen und Speck

Puddings 

 Black bread pudding (Schwarzbrotpudding)
 Götterspeise
 Rote Grütze
 Mandelkringel
 Sour cream cake (Schmandpudding)

Christmas dishes 
Honigkuchen auf dem Blech
Kleine pommersche Kuchen
Pommersche Honigbutterküchlein
Pommersche Quarkbollerchen
White Pfeffernüsse (Weiße Pfeffernüsse)

Drink 

Grog
Sanddorn: fruit wine, spirits, Sanddorn juice

Beers 
 Barther Pils, Bernstein, Ritter Alkun, Honigbier, Bockbier and fruit beers from the Barth brewery
 Mellenthiner Hell, Dunkel; seasonally also Weizen, Bock, Eisbock, Rauch, Schwarz and Alt in the water castle at Mellenthin on the island of Usedom
 Störtebeker Pilsener, Schwarzbier, Bernstein-Weizen, "1402", Roggen-Weizen, Strand-Räuber Mix beers and Stark-Bier; Stralsunder Pils, Lager, Traditionsbock, etc. from the Störtebeker Braumanufaktur in Stralsund
 Usedomer Inselbier Pils, Naturtrüb, Weizen, Schwarz and Inselalster in the Usedom brewery in Heringsdorf (Usedomer Brauhaus at Ostseeresidenz)

Gourmet food 
Several renowned restaurants in Pomerania have been awarded for excellence in the 21st century.
For example, amongst the starred restaurants listed in the  2015 Michelin Guide are the  Restaurant in the Hotel Vier Jahreszeiten in Binz on the island of Rügen, which is run by chef André Münchs, Restaurant im Gutshaus Stolpe in Stolpe (Peene), the Tom Wickboldt Restaurant in Heringsdorf on the island of Usedom, as well as the gourmet restaurant of Scheel's in the Scheelehof in Stralsund, headed by Stralsund chefs Björn Kapelke and Henri Zipperling.

The 2015 edition of the culinary guide, Gault-Millau, awarded chef Peter Knobloch's Knoblochs Kräuterküche in Göhren on Rügen with 16 of 20 points, an achievement also earned by the  Restaurant under Ralf Haug in Binz. Ranked at 15 points were chef René Bobzin, of the Zur alten Post in Bansin on Usedom, and Tom Wickboldt leading the restaurant of the same name in neighbouring Heringsdorf. Other restaurant guides like the Varta-Führer, Bertelsmann Guide, Der Feinschmecker and the Schlemmer Atlas rate gourmet food in West Pomerania as high quality.

Literature 
 Susanne Rohner: Das Beste aus der Pommerschen Küche – Kochen mit Tradition. Dörfler, Eggolsheim, 2009,  (96 pages).
 Hans Otzen, Barbara Otzen: Danziger Hering und 130 weitere leckere Rezepte aus Pommern. Edition Lempertz, 2012,  (245 page).
 Hannelore Doll-Hegedo: Spezialitäten aus Pommern, gewürzt mit Anekdoten. Stürz Verlag, Leer, 2003,  (82 pages).
 H. von Geibler: Pommersches Kochbuch – Mit 631 selbst erprobten Rezepten. Achte vermehrte und verbesserte Auflage, Prangesche Buchhandlung und Verlagsanstalt, Kolberg 1925; photomechanischer Nachdruck: 2. Auflage, Hinstorff, Rostock, 1996,  (256 pages).
 Dieter Kraatz: Rügen – Köstlichkeiten einer Inselküche. Rügendruck, 2011,  (135 pages).
 Utta Voutta: Pommern bittet zu Tisch. Herausgeber:  Kreisfrauengruppe der Vereinigten Landsmannschaften  e.V. (Bund der Vertriebenen), Kreis Rendsburg-Eckernförde, Eckenförde, 1986 (38 pages).
 Marie Rosnack: Stettiner Koch-Buch: Anweisung auf eine feine und schmackhafte Art zu kochen, zu backen und einzumachen. 4th ed., Nicolai'sche Buch- & Papierhandlung (C. F. Gutberlet), Stettin, 1838 (full text)
 Anita Weißflog: Die Küche des Landkreises Stolp. Eigenverlag, Dresden, 2007. (full text, pdf)

References

External links 

German Foods: Mecklenburg-Vorpommern cuisine
Off to MV - Cuisine: The new German food culture of the North

 
Pomerania
Pomerania
Cuisine
Cuisine